Taken may refer to:

People
 Floris Takens (1940-2010), Dutch mathematician

Arts, entertainment, and media

Taken film and television franchise
 Taken (franchise), a trilogy of action films starring Liam Neeson
 Taken (film), the first film in the trilogy
 Taken (2017 TV series), an American television series which acts as an origin story of Bryan Mills
 Taken: The Search for Sophie Parker, a 2013 made-for-TV film

Film
Taken, a 1999 film featuring Michael Rudder
 Taken, a Flash animation by Adam Phillips

Television 
 Taken (2016 TV series), a Canadian true crime documentary series
 Taken (miniseries), a 2002 American science fiction miniseries
 "Taken" (Alias), an episode of Alias
 "Taken" (Arrow), an episode of Arrow
 "Taken" (Law & Order: Special Victims Unit), an episode of Law & Order: Special Victims Unit

Literature 
 Taken (novel), a 2001 novel by Kathleen George
 Taken (Robert Crais novel), the 15th novel in Robert Crais' Elvis Cole/Joe Pike series
 Taken, the third novel in Benedict Jacka's Alex Verus series
 Taken, an omnibus volume comprising the first four novels in the series Left Behind: The Kids
 Taken, a fictional group in the novel The Black Company, by Glen Cook, and other books in the series

Music 
 "Taken" (song), a song by Stellar*
 "Taken", a song by Avail from One Wrench
 "Taken", a song by One Direction from Up All Night
 "Taken", a song by The Waifs from Sink or Swim
 "Taken", a song by Zug Izland from 3:33

Other uses 
 Takens' theorem, Floris Takens' mathematical theorem
The Taken enemy faction in the video game Destiny 2. This faction is associated with the Hive faction as mindless servants.